Loveridgelaps is a genus of snake in the family Elapidae. It contains a single species, Loveridgelaps elapoides, commonly known as the Solomons small-eyed snake.

It is found in the Solomon Islands.

References 

Elapidae
Monotypic snake genera
Reptiles of the Solomon Islands
Reptiles described in 1890